The Nittany Lion Wrestling Club (NLWC) is an amateur wrestling club and nonprofit organization. It was designated by USA Wrestling as a U.S. Olympic Regional Training Center and it hosts its practices at the Penn State wrestling room.

Resident athletes 

 Bekzod Abdurakhmonov
 Jordan Conaway
 Jaime Espinal
 Franklin Gómez
 Nick Nevills
 Bo Nickal
 Jason Nolf
 Josh Rodriguez
 Zain Retherford
 David Taylor
 Kyle Dake
 Thomas Gilman
 Vincenzo Joseph
 Kyle Snyder
 Anthony Cassar
 Riley Lefever

Coaching staff 

Cael Sanderson
Cody Sanderson
Casey Cunningham
Jake Varner
Mark McKnight
Eric Thompson

Key people 

Board of Directors
Jim Martin; President
Judd Arnold; Vice President
Bob Noll
Mary Noll
Matt Gaul
Dave Becker
Darrel Zaccagni
Bill Buckley
Management
Rich Lorenzo; Executive Director of Treasurer
Nick Fanthorpe; Co-director and coach
Dave Hart; Director / Business Chair / Membership Chair and Secretary
Commentators (events)
David Taylor
Jeff Byers
Vincenzo Joseph

Events 
During the COVID-19 pandemic, the NLWC has managed to put on a series of dual meets due to the current lack of wrestling events. Streamed on Rofkin, the first card took place on September 19, 2020, at State College, PA.

Event list

NLWC I
The NLWC I took place on September 19, 2020 in State College, Pennsylvania.

Results

NLWC II
The NLWC II took place on October 20, 2020 in State College, Pennsylvania.

Results

NLWC III
The NLWC III took place on November 24, 2020 in State College, Pennsylvania.

Results

NLWC IV 
The NLWC IV (also known as NLWC vs. WWC) took place on December 22, 2020 in State College, Pennsylvania. Unlike previous cards, this event featured a dual meet between the NLWC and the Wolfpack RTC.

Results

NLWC V
The NLWC V took place on February 23, 2021 in State College, Pennsylvania.

Results

References 

Penn State Nittany Lions wrestling
Pennsylvania State University faculty
Amateur wrestling
Wrestling
Freestyle wrestling
Recurring sporting events established in 2020
Sporting events in the United States
Sports in Pennsylvania
Sports in State College, Pennsylvania
Wrestling clubs